Gazelle FC is a football club from Chad based in N'Djamena. The club currently play in the Chad Premier League, the top flight of Chadian football.

Gazelle FC was founded on May 16, 1972 in the capital city of N'Djamena. The club has won four national titles and six national cup titles.

The club's colours are traditionally black and white.

History

Founded in 1972, the club played in Chadian second ligue from 1972 to 1973. In 1973–1974 season, the team secured promotion to the First Division. On May 8, 2007, the club has signed their first sponsorship deal ever, with Sogea Satom. On August 29, 2007, Gazelle has signed their second sponsorship deal, with Ecobank Tchad.
Gazelle have won 3 league titles (in 2009, 2012 and 2015), 6 national cups, 6 league-cups and 2 super-cups. They were league runners-up 7 times: in 1975, 1976, 1977, 1982, 1984, 2003 and 2010.
The club has also represented Chad in African competitions in 1994, 1998, 2000, 2002, 2005, 2010 and 2013.

Their first appearance at the African cup competition was in 1994 where they lost to Sony Elá Nguema of Equatorial Guinea, not a single goal Gazelle had scored.  The remaining three had Gazelle qualifying as cup winner, Gazelle scored their first continental goal in 1998 in a match against Dragons Ouémé, they never defeated that club in its two matches, one had a draw.  Gazelle came back in 2001 and faced Sporting Praia of Cape Verde, there, they made their first victory over that club 5-2in 2001, they elevated into the First Round after Sporting Praia withdrew and faced Democratic Congo's AS Saint-Luc and didn't won a match, the club scored two goals.  Gazelle appeared for the fourth time in 2002 and defeated Akokana 3-0 in the second match as the first one was scoreless, Gazelle challenged USM Alger from Algeria, the first match was a scoreless draw and lost the second one 1-5.  Their next appearance at the cup competition would be the CAF Confederation Cup and faced FC 105 from Gabon, the club lost two matches Gazelle only scored a goal there.

After winning their first championship title in 2009, Gazelle entered the continental championships for the first time in 2010, the club defeated the first match against Bayelsa which was Gazelle's last win, the second one had a two-goal draws and Gazelle advanced into the First Round where they challenged against Al Merreikh of the Sudan (now commonly as the Khartoumian Sudan), the club did not won a match and scored 2 goals to three in two of its matches, one had a goal draw and Gazelle was out, Gazelle scored its final goals to date. In their second CAF Champions League appearance and their recent continental competition, the club lost to Egypt's Zamalek in nearly large number of 7 in the first match and Gazelle scored no goal in either to its two matches, the second match was scoreless and was knocked out of the CAF Champions League competition.

Gazelle did not appear in the 2016 CAF Champions League, the Chadian Football Federation after their championship win decided to inscribe Ascot and Renaissance into the African club competition following a controversy over a Gazelle player with contracts with two clubs.

Stadium

Stade Omnisports Idriss Mahamat Ouya, also named Stade Nacional, is a multi-purpose stadium located in N'Djamena, Chad. It is currently used mostly for football matches.  The stadium holds 20,000 people. It is currently the home ground of the Chad national football team. It is named after former Chadian highjumper Mahamat Idriss (1942—1987).

Uniform

Its uniform colors for home games is a white shirt with black shorts and shocks and an orange T-shirt and socks with a black shorts for away games.  Its uniform colors in 2010 were a dark blue T-shirt and socks with yellow shorts for home games and white clothing for away games.

Honours

Chad Premier League: 4
 2009, 2012, 2015, 2020
Chad Cup: 6
 1973, 1974, 1997, 2000, 2001, 2012.
Chad League Cup: 6
Chad Super Cup: 2

Secondary Achievements

1 Banque BTCD Cup title
1 STEE Cup title

Performance in CAF competitions

Positions

2009: 1st
2010: 2nd
2011: 5th
2012: 1st
2013: Semi-finals (N'Djamena League Cup)
2014-15: 1st
2016: 1st (11 points)
2017: championship interrupted
2018: championship abandoned
2019: 4th in Group B
2020: 1st

Statistics

Best position: First Round (CAF Champions League)
Best position at cup competitions: First Round (continental)
Appearances at the League Cup: 9
Total matches played at the CAF Champions League: 6
Total matches played at home: 3
Total matches played away: 3
Total number of wins at the CAF Champions League: 1
Total draws at the CAF Champions League: 3
Total home draws: 1
Total away draws: 2
Total losses at the CAF Champions League: 2
Total number of goals scored at the CAF Champions League: 5
Total matches played at the continental cup competitions 13
Total matches played at home: 7
Total matches played away: 6
Total goals scored at the continental cup competitions: 13
CAF Cup Winners' Cup: 10
CAF Confederation Cup: 3

Current squad

Notable players

The club had few national team players like Hilaire Kédigui, Doumnan Herman, Cesar Madalangue and Mbairamadji Dillah.

Management

Current staff
.

Chairmen history

 Ageb Lamala (in 2013)
 Ajib Koulamallah (current)

Managerial history

Notes

References

External links
Club logo

 
Football clubs in Chad
N'Djamena
1972 establishments in Chad